Dig is an album by Miles Davis on Prestige Records, catalogue number 7012. It features tracks from a 1951 session at Apex Studios. First released in the 12-inch LP format in 1956, The original album was later released as Diggin with the catalogue number PR 7281 and a different cover. Dig was reissued as a compact disc with additional tracks. 

After inaugurating the school of cool jazz with the Birth of the Cool recording sessions in 1949 and 1950, Davis almost immediately turned away from that sound in the early 1950s, instead exploring hard bop. Dig was also the jazz recording debut of saxophonist Jackie McLean, and was one of Sonny Rollins's earliest recordings; both men would go on to become major voices in jazz.

Release history
The material was originally released on two 10-inch LPs, except for "Denial", released on a 1954 7" (Prestige PREP 1361). "Dig"  and "It's Only a Paper Moon" first appeared on The New Sounds (PRLP 124), as did "Conception"  and "My Old Flame". "Bluing" and "Out of the Blue" were originally released on Blue Period (PRLP 140). When the material was reconfigured for the new 12-inch format, "Conception"  and "My Old Flame" were included on the Prestige various artists collection Conception (PRLP 7013).

Track listing

12" LP

CD

Personnel
 Miles Davis – trumpet
 Jackie McLean – alto saxophone (1, 3-5)
 Sonny Rollins – tenor saxophone
 Walter Bishop, Jr. – piano
 Tommy Potter – double bass
 Art Blakey – drums

References

1956 albums
Miles Davis albums
Prestige Records albums
Albums produced by Bob Weinstock